John Allison Raymond Hyatt (28 July 1893 – 29 March 1969) was an Australian politician.

Born in Blakeville to sawmiller Henry Hyatt and Elizabeth Dalton, he attended Blakeville State School and became a sawmiller and timber contractor. He served in the Australian Imperial Force's 14th Battalion in Egypt and France during World War I; on 22 December 1917 he married Elizabeth Stratton, with whom he had four children. Returning from the war in 1918 he became a postal worker, and became involved in the Postal Workers' Union. In 1943 he was elected to the Victorian Legislative Assembly as the Labor member for Warrenheip and Grenville, transferring to Hampden in 1945. He was defeated in 1947. Hyatt died at Ballarat in 1969.

References

|-

1893 births
1969 deaths
Members of the Victorian Legislative Assembly
Australian Army soldiers
Australian military personnel of World War I
Australian Labor Party members of the Parliament of Victoria
20th-century Australian politicians